Calcutta If You Must Exile Me is the best known single poem of the renowned Indian English poet and media personality Pritish Nandy. The poem is widely anthologised in major Indian English poetry collections and is regarded as a pioneering classic in modern Indian English writing.
The poem is remarkable for its breathless tempo, vivid imagery and unsuppressed angst at societal decadence. The poem is addressed to the Indian city of Kolkata, although not in eulogical terms.

Excerpts from the poem

Calcutta if you must exile me wound my lips before I go
only words remain and the gentle touch of your fingers on my
lips Calcutta burn my eyes before I go into the night
the headless corpse in a Dhakuria bylane the battered youth his brains
blown out and the silent vigil that takes you to Pataldanga lane
where they will gun you down without vengeance or hate

 *******

I will show you the fatigue of that woman who died near Chitpur out
of sheer boredom and the cages of Burrabazar where passion hides
the wrinkle of virgins who have aged waiting
for a sexless war that never came
only obscene lust remains in their eyes after time has wintered their exacting thighs
and I will show you the hawker who died with Calcutta in his eyes
Calcutta if you must exile me destroy my sanity before I go

 *******

Origin and the Calcutta connection
The poem was written in the late 1970s or early 1980s. The poet himself reminiscences in a 2009 interview that the poem describes his feelings of a city he left 27 years ago.

The poet was a resident of Calcutta (now Kolkata), and in the poet's own words, the poem is based on his direct real life experience of the city. The poem evokes the mood of a man born in Calcutta, bred in Calcutta and living in Calcutta.

Structure and criticism
The poem is notable for its fast tempo, impassioned conversational diction and sharp images depicting the "brutalities of city life. The most unusual feature of the poem is that it does not have a single punctuation mark - no comma, fullstop or hyphen. In fact, the entire poem is composed only of words, without any hyphenation or fancy spacing, almost as a rebellion against regimentation of any poetic structure.  Such a style was a trendsetter during the period of its composition.

In the poem, although Nandy portrays the ruthlessness prevalent in the city, he loves the city so much that he does not want to leave it.

Legacy
The unique style of the poem has inspired many modern Indian poets. The poem was harbinger of a new style of realistic writing on urban life in fast-paced tempo. Although the poem has spawned many imitations, none has equalled the power and majesty of the original.This poem brought a breath of fresh air, almost true in an Indian environment and starkly different from the mainstream Indian writings of the day.

See also
  Text of Full Poem
  pritish Nandy - A Short Biography
Indian poetry
Indian Writing in English
Popular Indian Poems

Notes

English-language poems
Indian English poems
Indian poems
1982 poems